The High Schells Wilderness is a  wilderness area in the Schell Creek Range of White Pine County, in the U.S. state of Nevada.  The Wilderness lies within the Humboldt-Toiyabe National Forest and is therefore administered by the U.S. Forest Service.

Flora and fauna
The High Schells Wilderness is home to an abundance of elk, mule deer, and mountain lion, which thrive in forests of quaking aspen, Douglas and white fir, Engelmann spruce, and limber and bristlecone pine.  Golden eagles can be seen soaring the updrafts along the crest of the Schell Creek Range.  Riparian vegetation provides key habitat for blue grouse, sage grouse, chukar and many other species.  Perennial streams throughout the area support populations of rainbow, brook, cutthroat and brown trout.

Archeology
Archeological sites in the High Schells Wilderness include petroglyphs and lithic scatters.

See also
 Nevada Wilderness Areas
 List of wilderness areas in Nevada
 List of U.S. Wilderness Areas
 Wilderness Act

References

External links
 Humboldt-Toiyabe National Forest - High Schells Wilderness
 Friends of Nevada Wilderness - High Schells Wilderness
 official Humboldt-Toiyabe National Forest website
 National Atlas: Map of Humboldt-Toiyabe National Forest
 NevadaWilderness.org

Humboldt–Toiyabe National Forest
Wilderness areas of Nevada
Protected areas of White Pine County, Nevada
IUCN Category Ib